Terence Edward Shaw (born 4 May 1937) is a New Zealand cricketer. He played in 33 first-class matches for Northern Districts from 1956 to 1964.

See also
 List of Northern Districts representative cricketers

References

External links
 

1937 births
Living people
New Zealand cricketers
Northern Districts cricketers
People from Paeroa
North Island cricketers
Cricketers from Waikato